William Cuesta (born February 19, 1993) is a Colombian footballer playing for Deportes Tolima. From La Equidad, Cuesta was sold to Deportes Tolima along with new transfers Sergio Mosquera and Christian Alarcon.

Appearing twice in cup games with La Equidad, he knew Victor Giraldo before the transfer which helped him assimilate into the Deportes Tolima squad.

References

La Equidad footballers
Deportes Tolima footballers
Colombian footballers
Association football goalkeepers
Living people
1993 births
Sportspeople from Antioquia Department